12/8 may refer to:
 December 8 (month-day date notation)
 12 August (day-month date notation)
 , in sheet music, a time signature containing twelve quavers per measure
 12 shillings and 8 pence in UK predecimal currency

See also
 128 (disambiguation)
 8/12 (disambiguation)